Boss is a surname of European origin, mainly Germanic.

In English Boss comes from the nickname for a hunchback, or bossu in Old French meaning ‘hunchbacked’ (a derivative of bosse ‘lump’, ‘hump’. From French it can also be compared to Bossard. In German it is from a short form of the personal name Borkhardt, a variant of Burkhart, and possibly a differed spelling of South German Bös. In Danish it is the medieval variant of the surname Buus.

Notable people with the surname include:

Geoffrey Boss (born 1969), American professional racing driver
Harley Boss (1908–1964), American baseball player and coach
Hugo Boss (1885–1948), German fashion designer
Isaac Boss (born 1980), Irish rugby union player
Jeff Boss (born 1963), American conspiracy theorist
Kevin Boss (born 1984), American football tight end
Lewis Boss (1846–1912), American astronomer
Marcellus Boss (1901–1967), American politician, 5th Civilian Governor of Guam
Medard Boss (1903–1990), Swiss psychoanalytic psychiatrist
Terry Boss (born 1981), Puerto Rican association football goalkeeper
Stephen "tWitch" Boss (1982-2022), American actor

References